The national symbols of Bahrain are official and unofficial flags, icons or cultural expressions that are emblematic, representative or otherwise characteristic of Bahrain and of its culture.

Symbol

References 

National symbols of Bahrain